Colonel Gerald Paul Carr (August 22, 1932August 26, 2020) was an American mechanical and aeronautical engineer, United States Marine Corps officer, naval aviator, and NASA astronaut. He was commander of Skylab 4, the third and final crewed visit to the Skylab Orbital Workshop, from  November 16, 1973, to February 8, 1974.

Early life and education 
Carr was born in Denver, Colorado, on August 22, 1932, but was raised in Santa Ana, California, which he considered his home town. He was the son of Thomas E. Carr and Freda L. Carr. He was active in the Boy Scouts of America where he achieved its highest rank, Eagle Scout. Carr graduated from Santa Ana High School in Santa Ana in 1950.

Carr received a Bachelor of Engineering degree in mechanical engineering from the University of Southern California (USC) in 1954, where he was a member of Tau Kappa Epsilon fraternity. He spent five years flying fighter jets, then returned to school. He earned a Bachelor of Science degree in aeronautical engineering from the U.S. Naval Postgraduate School in 1961, and a Master of Science degree in aeronautical engineering from Princeton University in 1962.

Carr married his high-school sweetheart, Joann Ruth Petrie. They had two sets of twins and six children total. They divorced and his second marriage was to Patricia Musick in 1979.

Military service 
Carr began his military service with the U.S. Navy, and in 1950 he was appointed a midshipman with the Naval Reserve Officers Training Corps (NROTC) detachment at the University of Southern California. Upon graduation in 1954, he received his commission in the U.S. Marine Corps and subsequently reported to The Basic School at Marine Corps Base Quantico, Virginia. He received flight training at Naval Air Station Pensacola, Florida, and Naval Air Station Kingsville, Texas, and was then assigned to VMF(AW)-114 where he gained experience in the F9F Cougar and the F-6A Skyray.

After postgraduate training, he served with VMFA-122, from 1962 to 1965, piloting the F-8 Crusader in the United States and the Far East. Other aircraft he has flown include the F-4, T-1A, T-28, T-33, T-38, H-13, and ground effect machines.

He logged more than 8,000 flying hours, 5,365 hours of which were jet time.

NASA career 
Carr was one of the 19 astronauts selected by NASA in April 1966. When informed by NASA of his selection for astronaut training, he was assigned to the test directors section of Marine Air Control Squadron 3, a unit responsible for the testing and evaluation of the Marine Tactical Data System. He served as a member of the astronaut support crews and as CAPCOM for the Apollo 8 and Apollo 12 flights, and was involved in the development and testing of the Lunar Roving Vehicle. He was in the likely crew rotation position to serve as lunar module pilot for Apollo 19 and walk on the Moon before this mission was canceled by NASA in 1970.

Skylab 4 

Carr was commander of Skylab 4 (third and final crewed visit to the Skylab Orbital Workshop) launched November 16, 1973, with splashdown on February 8, 1974. He was the first rookie astronaut to command a mission since Neil Armstrong on Gemini 8 (later followed by Joe Engle on STS-2 in 1981 and Raja Chari on SpaceX Crew-3 in 2021) and was accompanied on the record-setting 34.5-million-mile flight by science pilot Dr. Edward Gibson and pilot William Pogue. The crew successfully completed 56 experiments, 26 science demonstrations, 15 subsystem-detailed objectives, and 13 student investigations during their 1,214 orbits of the Earth. They also acquired extensive Earth resources observation data using hand-held cameras and Skylab's Earth Resources Experiment Package camera and sensor array. They logged 338 hours of operations of the Apollo Telescope Mount, which made extensive observations of the sun's solar processes.

From February 1974 until March 1978, Carr and his Skylab 4 teammates shared the world record for individual time in space: 2,017 hours 15 minutes 32 seconds, and Carr logged 15 hours and 51 minute in three EVAs outside the Orbital Workshop.

In mid-1977, Carr was named head of the design support group within the Astronaut Office responsible for providing crew support to such activities as space transportation system design, simulations, testing, and safety assessment, and for development of man/machine interface requirements.

Carr retired from the U.S. Marine Corps as colonel in September 1975 and from NASA in June 1977.

Later life 
Carr started his post-NASA career as manager of corporate development at Bovay Engineers, Inc., a Houston engineering consulting firm. He later became a senior vice president, leaving the firm in 1981.

He was a senior consultant on special staff to the President of Applied Research, Inc., Los Angeles, California, from 1981 to 1983. From 1983 until 1985 Carr was manager of The University of Texas  Telescope Project.

Carr founded CAMUS, Inc. in 1984 based in Vermont. The family-owned corporation provides technical support services in zero-gravity human factors engineering, procedures development, operations analysis, training and systems integration. CAMUS was a major contributor as a technical support subcontractor to Boeing in the crew systems design of the International Space Station. In addition, the corporation is involved in fine art production designed by Carr's wife, artist and sculptor Pat Musick.

Carr died in Albany, New York, on August 26, 2020, four days after his 88th birthday.

Organizations 
Carr was a former director of the Sunsat Energy Council; a former director of the Houston Pops Orchestra; and a former director of the National Space Society.

Awards and honors 
He was presented with an honorary Doctorate of Science in aeronautical engineering from Parks College of Saint Louis University, Cahokia, Illinois, in 1976.

He was awarded the National Defense Service Medal; Armed Forces Expeditionary Medal; Marine Corps Expeditionary Medal, and a Letter of Commendation from the Commander of Carrier Division Two. Navy Distinguished Service Medal and the Navy Astronaut Wings; 1974; University of Southern California Alumni Merit Award, 1974; Boy Scouts of America Distinguished Eagle Scout Award, 1974; Marine Corps Aviation Association's Exceptional Achievement Award, 1974. Carr was awarded the 1974 FAI Gold Space Medal. He received the City of New York and City of Chicago Gold Medals for 1974. Carr was one of 24 Apollo astronauts who were inducted into the U.S. Astronaut Hall of Fame in 1997.

The three Skylab astronaut crews were awarded the 1973 Robert J. Collier Trophy "For proving beyond question the value of man in future explorations of space and the production of data of benefit to all the people on Earth". In 1974, President Nixon presented the Skylab 4 crew with the NASA Distinguished Service Medal. Fédération Aéronautique Internationale awarded the Skylab 4 crew the De La Vaulx Medal and Vladimir M. Komarov Diploma for 1974. The American Astronautical Society's 1975 Flight Achievement Award was awarded to the Skylab 4 crew. Carr accepted the 1975 Dr. Robert H. Goddard Memorial Trophy from President Gerald Ford, awarded to the Skylab astronauts. The Skylab 4 crew won the AIAA Haley Astronautics Award in 1975 "For demonstrated outstanding courage and skill during their record-breaking 84-day Skylab mission".

In 1974, Gerald P. Carr Intermediate School (previously Ralph C. Smedley Junior High) in Santa Ana, California, was renamed in Carr's honor, and the school's team name is the Astros, in honor of Carr's NASA achievements.

See also 
 The Astronaut Monument
 List of Eagle Scouts
 List of spaceflight records

References

External links 

 Astronautix biography of Gerald P. Carr
 
 Carr at Spaceacts 
 Carr at Encyclopedia of Science

1932 births
2020 deaths
1973 in spaceflight
Apollo program astronauts
Aviators from Colorado
United States Marine Corps astronauts
United States Astronaut Hall of Fame inductees
People from Denver
People from Santa Ana, California
Military personnel from California
USC Viterbi School of Engineering alumni
Naval Postgraduate School alumni
Princeton University School of Engineering and Applied Science alumni
United States Marine Corps colonels
United States Naval Aviators
Recipients of the Navy Distinguished Service Medal
Recipients of the NASA Distinguished Service Medal
Collier Trophy recipients
American aerospace engineers
American mechanical engineers
20th-century American businesspeople
Engineers from California
Skylab program astronauts
Spacewalkers
Military personnel from Colorado